The Mediterranean Social Forum is the first interregional Social Forum, created between movements from Europe, Maghreb and Mediterranean Middle East

See also
 World social forum
 European Social Forum

External links

 Official website

Social forums